Seraya Energy is a licensed electricity retailer serving the Singaporean electricity market. It is a subsidiary of YTL PowerSeraya Pte. Limited, one of the largest power generation companies in Singapore.

The company serves customers in a wide range of sectors including manufacturing, government, education, retail, and food and beverage. It also offers bundled utilities like steam and industrial water, and has introduced value-added services for its energy customers.

Seraya Energy is one of the leading electricity retailers in terms of market share serving the Singaporean electricity market.

References

External links
Geneco (by Seraya Energy)

Electric power companies of Singapore